Carsen Germyn (born February 22, 1982 in Campbell River, British Columbia) is a former professional ice hockey right wing who played 4 games in the National Hockey League (NHL) with the Calgary Flames.

Playing career
Germyn played five seasons in the Western Hockey League.  He played for the Kelowna Rockets and then for the Red Deer Rebels.  He started his professional career with the Norfolk Admirals of the American Hockey League.  On July 6, 2004, he was signed as a free agent by the Calgary Flames.  They assigned him to the Lowell Lock Monsters in 2004–05 then to the Omaha Ak-Sar-Ben Knights for the 2005–06 season.  He played his first National Hockey League game on April 1, 2006 with the Flames against the Edmonton Oilers.

In the late summer of 2010, Germyn signed a two-year contract with EHC Olten, a Swiss National League B team, where he played alongside American-born Marty Sertich scoring 45 points in 36 games. On June 18, 2011, Germyn was released from the final year of his contract to join the Straubing Tigers of the German DEL.

Towards the end of his third season with the Straubing Tigers in 2013–14, with the club out of contention for the playoffs, he was loaned for the remainder of the season to AIK IF of the Swedish Hockey League, on February 26, 2014.

Career statistics

References

External links

1982 births
Abbotsford Heat players
AIK IF players
Calgary Flames players
EHC Olten players
Ice hockey people from British Columbia
Kelowna Rockets players
Living people
Lowell Lock Monsters players
Norfolk Admirals players
Omaha Ak-Sar-Ben Knights players
People from Campbell River, British Columbia
Quad City Flames players
Red Deer Rebels players
Sportspeople from British Columbia
Straubing Tigers players
Undrafted National Hockey League players
Canadian ice hockey right wingers